Cornelius Theodor Hasselblatt (born 1960) is a German Finno-Ugric specialist, translator and Estophile. He lives in the Netherlands.

From 1980 to 1986 he studied Finno-Ugric languages and culture in Hamburg and Helsinki. In 1990 he defended his doctoral thesis.

From 1998 to 2014 he was a professor of Finno-Ugric languages and culture at Groningen University.

He is a foreign member of the Estonian Academy of Sciences.

Works
Translations
 Andrus Kivirähk, "Frösche küssen" ('A Frog Kiss'). Willegoos 2015
 Andrus Kivirähk, "Der Schiet und das Frühjahr" ('Poo and Spring'). Willegoos 2015

References

Living people
1960 births
German philologists
Estophiles